Arubolana aruboides is a species of crustacean in the family Cirolanidae. It is endemic to Bermuda.

References

Cymothoida
Endemic fauna of Bermuda
Taxonomy articles created by Polbot
Crustaceans described in 1983
Taxobox binomials not recognized by IUCN